Dunqul Oasis is an oasis near the First Cataract of the Nile in southern Egypt.  It lies southwest of modern Aswan.  Considered one of the important oases of Ancient Egypt, it was used by General Weni as a staging point for military incursions into Nubia during the reign of Pepi I.

References

Oases of Egypt